Crossea alliciens is a species of small sea snail or micromollusc, a marine gastropod mollusc in the family Conradiidae.

Distribution
This marine species occurs in the Gulf of Oman.

References

 Trew, A., 1984. The Melvill-Tomlin Collection. Part 30. Trochacea. Handlists of the Molluscan Collections in the Department of Zoology, National Museum of Wales.

External links
 To World Register of Marine Species

alliciens
Gastropods described in 1910